Kristen Ann Maloney (born March 10, 1981) is a retired gymnast from Pen Argyl, Pennsylvania, in the United States. She won bronze in the team event at the 2000 Olympic Games. Maloney was also the U.S. senior all-around national champion in 1998 and 1999 and the 1998 Goodwill Games gold medalist on the balance beam.

Maloney also competed for the University of California, Los Angeles in the NCAA from 2001 until 2005.

Early life
Maloney was born on March 10, 1981, in Hackettstown, New Jersey and attended Pen Argyl Area High School in Pen Argyl, Pennsylvania in the Lehigh Valley region of eastern Pennsylvania.

Gymnastics career

Maloney trained at Parkettes National Gymnastics Training Center in Allentown, Pennsylvania and was a consistent member of the U.S. national gymnastics team from 1993 to 2000. She competed in a variety of minor international events as a junior elite and, as a senior, qualified for the 1996 Olympic Trials.

Maloney finished fourteenth at the Trials in the shadow of the "Magnificent Seven," but she became one of the most prominent American gymnasts from 1997 to 2000. The national champion in the all-around in 1998 and 1999, she was a key member of the American team at several major international meets. She participated in the 1997 and 1999 World Championships, earned a gold medal on the balance beam at the 1998 Goodwill Games in New York, and won the all-around at the 1998 Pacific Alliance Championships. Maloney ended her elite career at the 2000 Olympics in Sydney, where the American team won the bronze medal after a 2010 investigation by the International Gymnastics Federation disqualified the original bronze medalist, China, for falsifying a gymnast's age. She also finished nineteenth in the individual all-around.

After the Olympics, Maloney attended UCLA on a full athletic scholarship and competed in NCAA gymnastics with the Bruins. She earned All-American honors and scored perfect tens at several meets. In her final college competition, the NCAA Championships, Maloney placed second in the all-around behind teammate Tasha Schwikert, won gold on vault and floor, and successfully completed a double-twisting Yurchenko vault and a full-twisting double layout on floor exercise.

Maloney was plagued by persistent injuries throughout her elite and collegiate careers. A nagging stress fracture led to the placement of a titanium rod in her leg. After one wave of serious injury and illness, Maloney missed two full years of competition with the Bruins; her subsequent return to full form earned her UCLA's C.H.A.M.P.S. Inspirational Award. As a fifth year senior, she won the Honda Sports Award as the nation's top female gymnast.

Maloney graduated from UCLA in 2005 and worked as a gymnastics coach in California. One of her gymnasts was Shavahn Church, a member of the British national team. For a time, she lived in Europe and worked with Cirque du Soleil. She also taught preschool in Queens, New York City.

Maloney began working as an assistant gymnastics coach for the University of New Hampshire in Durham, New Hampshire in the 2010-11 season. She has been an assistant gymnastics coach at Iowa State University in Ames, Iowa since July 2011.

Skills
Her routines included the following skills:

Vault: Double-twisting Yurchenko
Uneven bars: Maloney; Gienger; full-twisting double layout dismount
Balance beam: Front tuck mount; wolf jump half, wolf jump, Rulfova; back handspring, layout, layout; punch front; back handspring, two-foot back handspring, two-foot layout; back handspring, back handspring, double back dismount
Floor exercise: Full-twisting double layout; double layout; punch front through to triple twist; double back; whip to immediate double layout

Eponymous skill 
Maloney has one eponymous skill listed in the Code of Points, a toe-on Shaposhnikova on the uneven bars.

Awards and honors
1999: James E. Sullivan Award: Finalist
1999: USA Gymnastics Gymnast of the Year
2005: Honda Sports Award
2017: UCLA sports hall of fame

References

External links
USA Gymnastics biography
Full list of competitive results at Gymn Forum
Iowa State biography
Maloney(Uneven Bars Skills)

1981 births
Living people
American female artistic gymnasts
Olympic bronze medalists for the United States in gymnastics
Gymnasts at the 2000 Summer Olympics
Originators of elements in artistic gymnastics
Parkettes
Pen Argyl Area High School alumni
People from Hackettstown, New Jersey
Sportspeople from Northampton County, Pennsylvania
UCLA Bruins women's gymnasts
Sportspeople from Warren County, New Jersey
Medalists at the 2000 Summer Olympics
U.S. women's national team gymnasts
Goodwill Games medalists in gymnastics
Competitors at the 1998 Goodwill Games
NCAA gymnasts who have scored a perfect 10